Ihud ('Unity') was a small binationalist Zionist political party founded by Judah Leon Magnes, Martin Buber, Ernst Simon and Henrietta Szold, former supporters of Brit Shalom, in 1942 following the Biltmore Conference. Other prominent members were Moshe Smilansky, agronomist  (1868–1947), and Judge Joseph Moshe Valero.

History
The Ihud party presented its ideas to the Anglo-American Committee of Inquiry in 1946 and then to the United Nations Special Committee on Palestine in 1947. The Anglo-American Committee voted largely in favour of the proposals of Ihud, recommending an Economic Union in Palestine.

Ihud proposed the creation of joint organs of government, and a division of the country into districts based on a communal basis.

The founders and representatives of Ihud conveyed their views through the publication of Ba'ayot (formerly known as Ba'ayot Hayom - Problems of the Time). In the beginning of 1947, Ba'ayot printed an article featuring the thoughts of Albert Einstein on the most suitable approach to resolving the issue of Palestine. In response to Richard Crossman's assertion that partition was the only fair solution left for the British, Einstein said: "He may be right; but I see no permanent solution other than one based on a bi-national administration under United Nations rule." After the foundation of the state of Israel, Ihud replaced its official journal Ba'ayot with a new periodical, Ner.

According to Sasson Sofer, writing in Zionism and the Foundations of Israeli Diplomacy (1998):
"Ihud constituted the first instance in the history of Israel's politics of what happens when intellectuals seek to propose a compromise solution in the course of a violent national conflict. It demonstrated their organisational weakness and the fact that their political influence was marginal. Ihud presages the fate which was to befall Israel's intelligentsia whenever it approached the white-hot heart of the Israel-Arab conflict and sought to join in the political fray."

References
 

Political organizations based in Israel
Middle East peace efforts
Political parties in Mandatory Palestine
Political parties established in 1942
One-state solution
1942 establishments in Mandatory Palestine
Political parties with year of disestablishment missing
Intercommunal conflict in Mandatory Palestine